Gerald E. "Jerry" Thomas (born 1935) is a former baseball pitcher. He won the 1956 College World Series Most Outstanding Player award while a junior at University of Minnesota. He is one of three players from University of Minnesota to win that award. The others are John Erickson and Dave Winfield.

He was an All-American in 1956.

Thomas played professionally from 1957 to 1960, never reaching the majors.

He was inducted into the University of Minnesota Sports Hall of Fame in 1995.

References

All-American college baseball players
Minnesota Golden Gophers baseball players
1935 births
College World Series Most Outstanding Player Award winners
Living people
Durham Bulls players
Birmingham Barons players
Augusta Tigers players
Knoxville Smokies players
Aberdeen Pheasants players